The 2006 CAR Development Trophy was the third edition of second level rugby union tournament in Africa. The competition involved fifteen teams that were divided into two zones (North and South). The winner of the two zone were admitted to final

North Zone 

Two pools of four teams, with a zone final between the winners

Pool A

Pool B

Final 
 Niger won by Withdraw of Nigeria.

South Zone

Pool A 
(Swaziland Withdraw)

Pool B

South Final

Final 

2006
2006 rugby union tournaments for national teams
2006 in African rugby union